"Gold Slugs" is a song by DJ Khaled, featuring Chris Brown, August Alsina and Fetty Wap from Khaled's eighth studio album I Changed a Lot.

Music video
A music video for the track premiered on October 12, 2015, via WorldStarHipHop. On October 16, 2015, it was uploaded to Khaled's Vevo channel. It features DJ Khaled, Chris Brown, August Alsina, Fetty Wap and models behind Khaled's restaurant the licking singing and dancing.

Charts

Certifications

References

External links
 
 

2015 singles
2015 songs
DJ Khaled songs
Chris Brown songs
August Alsina songs
Fetty Wap songs
Republic Records singles
Songs written by Chris Brown
Songs written by Lee on the Beats
Songs written by DJ Khaled
Songs written by Fetty Wap